The Thomas Range is a mountain range of north central Juab County of western Utah, United States. Topaz Mountain is in the southern part of the range and Spor Mountain lies to the southwest.

References

External links
 Spor Mountain beryllium mines, article at NASA Earth Observatory, July 16, 2021
 Slides of the Fluorspar, Beryllium, and Uranium Deposits at Spor Mountain, Utah by David A. Lindsey, USGS

Mountain ranges of Utah
Mountain ranges of Juab County, Utah